Scred Connexion is a French rap collective launched in the 1990s composed by Fabe, Koma, Haroun, Mokless and Morad, with the assistance of Butch. Fabe decided to quit his rapping career in 2000 and quit the collective after releasing one additional solo album.

"Scred" originates from a track by collective member Koma in his first maxi Époque de fous and is verlan for discret (meaning discreet). The collective released six musical projects with each member keeping his independence and solo projects they worked on concurrently. The collective addressed many issues in French society becoming a militant band for social justice and change distinguishing itself with quality of text and being critical of superficial rappers and favoring more fundamental content, promoting the slogan "Jamais dans la tendance mais toujours dans la bonne direction", after a member of the formation, Fabe, launched it in his piece "Impertinent".

The song Monnaie Monnaie is part of the Carbone's movie soundtrack in 2017.

Discography: Scred Connexion

Solo careers of members of the collective

Fabe

Fabe (born in 1971 Paris, France) is a French rapper from Barbès, a neighborhood of Paris. He was one of the most established of the members who already had a long list of releases. Fabe decided to quit his rapping career in 2000 and left the collective.

Solo discography
1994: Je n'aime pas
1994: Befa surprend ses frères
1996: Lentement mais sûrement
1996: Fais-moi du vent
1996: Le fond et la forme
1998: Détournement de son (FR: #33)
2000: La rage de dire (FR: #59)

He also had a charting single "Ça fait partie de mon passé" that reached #45 in France.

Haroun
Solo discography
2007: Sur scène (Maxi)
2007: Au front
2008: Le zonard (Maxi)

Koma
Koma is a rapper of Algerian origin from the 18th arrondissement of Paris. He grew up in Barbès.

Solo discography
1997: Tout est calculé
1999: Le réveil

Mokless
Mokless (born in 1977) is a rapper of Tunisian origin from the 18th arrondissement; he too grew up in Barbès. He started MCing in 1996 before joining Scred Connexion.

In 2012, Mokless got involved in a musical project with Guizmo and rapper Congolese-French Despo Rutti from  that has resulted in the issue of the joint EP Jamais 2 sans 3 followed by the joint studio album Jamais 203. The three acts are touring France in promotion of the releases.

Solo discography 
2006: Coup de Maître
2011: Le poids des mots (FR: #45)

Discography as part of trio Guizmo, Despo Rutti & Mokless
2013: Jamais 2 sans 3 (EP before the album)
2013: Jamais 203

Morad
Morad (born in 1977), a French rapper of Algerian origin, is signed with Only Music.

Solo discography 
2010: Le bon vieux son
2012: Le survivant

References

French rappers